Paul-Marc-Joseph Chenavard (9 December 1808 – 1895, Paris) was a French painter.

Life

Entering the École des beaux-arts en 1825, he studied in the studio of Ingres alongside his friend Joseph Guichard, then in the studios of Hersent and Delacroix.

Under the influence of German philosophy and painting, he considered art's aim had to be humanitarian and civilising.
He was buried in the new Cimetière de Loyasse at Lyon.

Works 

Hell (1846), Montpellier, Musée Fabre
The Continence of Scipio (1848) Lyon, Musée des Beaux-Arts
Divina Tragedia (between 1865 and 1869) Paris, Musée d'Orsay

Bibliography
 Joseph C. Sloane, Paul Marc Joseph Chenavard: Artist of 1848, Chapel Hill, The University of North Carolina Press, 214 p.
 Théophile Silvestre, Histoire des artistes vivants français et étrangers, Paris, 1856
 Théophile Gautier : description des peintures de Chenavard au Panthéon sur : http://gallica.bnf.fr/ark:/12148/bpt6k109148c/f4.image.r=.langFR

Notes 

1808 births
1895 deaths
19th-century French painters
French male painters
École des Beaux-Arts alumni
19th-century French male artists